An elementary cognitive task (ECT) is any of a range of basic tasks which require only a small number of mental processes and which have easily specified correct outcomes. Although ECTs may be cognitively simple there is evidence that performance on such tasks correlates well with other measures of general intelligence such as Raven's Progressive Matrices. For example, corrected for attenuation (random measurement error), the correlation between IQ test scores and inspection time (how long the subject needs to discriminate between 2 stimuli at a specified level of accuracy) is about 0.5. It has been found that when a battery of ECTs is factor analyzed, the general factor that emerges from this is strongly correlated with general intelligence extracted from traditional IQ batteries, and relates similarly to other variables.

Arthur Jensen invented a simple measurement tool for easily collecting reaction time data, subsequently called a Jensen box. Using this, he restarted research on the link between general intelligence and ECTs in the 1970s which had previously been considered a dead end. This earlier conclusion was based on research conducted around 1901-1911 by Clark Wissler with methodology considered very problematic by today's standards. Today, mental chronometry is a significant research topic with about 3800 papers published per year in the period 2005-2015.

The term was proposed by John Bissell Carroll in 1980, who posited that all test performance could be analyzed and broken down to building blocks called ECTs. Test batteries such as Microtox were developed based on this theory and have shown utility in the evaluation of test subjects under the influence of carbon monoxide or alcohol.

See also 

 Mental chronometry
 Inspection time

References

Further reading 

 Jensen, Arthur R. (2006). Clocking the Mind: Mental Chronometry and Individual Differences. Burlington: Elsevier. . OCLC 437173754.

Psychological tests and scales